Aerial art may refer to:

 Aerial dance
 Aerial silk
 Aerial acrobatics
 Aerobatics, flying maneuvers involving aircraft

See also
 Skywriting
 Fireworks display
 Aerial landscape art